Hubert Boulard (21 January 1971 – 12 February 2020) was a French comics writer and colorist usually credited mononymously as "Hubert".

Biography
Boulard attended the École régionale des beaux-arts d'Angers, and began writing comics in the 1990s, after befriending Yoann, who had encouraged him to start in the field of comics.

He produced Miss Pas Touche in 2006, illustrated by Kerascoët and published by Dargaud, which sold 30,000 as of 2017. Since then, Boulard has worked with Étienne Le Roux, Marie Caillou, with whom he won the 2017  for best album. With , he created , which won best comic series at the 2019 Lucca Comics & Games Conference in Italy.

Boulard produced the collective work Les Gens normaux, paroles lesbiennes gay bi trans, published in 2013, during the time when France was voting on the legalization of gay marriage. In April 2020, written by Boulard with illustrations by Zanzim, is set to be released.

Hubert Boulard died on 12 February 2020 at the age of 49, said his publisher in a press release.

Works
Les Yeux verts (2002–2004)
Le Legs de l'alchimiste (2002–2007)
 (2006–2009)
La Sirène des pompiers (2006)
Bestioles (2010)
 (2010)
 (2011–2014)
 (2012–2013)
La Ligne Droite (2013)
WW2.2 T6 : Chien Jaune (2013)
Le Temple du Passé (2014–2015)
 (2014–2020)
Monsieur désire ? (2016)
La Nuit mange le Jour (2017)
Le Boiseleur (2019)
 with

Awards
Sélection officielle jeunesse at the Angoulême International Comics Festival for Bestioles (2011)
Sélection officielle at the Angoulême International Comics Festival for Beauté (2012)
Prix Jacques-Lob at the BD Boum Festival (2015)
Firecracker Alternative Book Award for Beauté
Gran Guinigi Award for Les Ogres-Dieux at the Lucca Comics & Games Conference (2017)
Prix Diagonale for Monsieur désire ? (2017)
Finalist for the Grand Prix de la Critique for Monsieur désire ? (2017)
Sélection officielle at the Angoulême International Comics Festival for Les Ogres-Dieux (2017)
  for Peau d'homme with Zanzim
 with Zanzim for Peau d'homme.

References

French comics writers
Comics colorists
1971 births
People from Saint-Renan
Place of death missing
2020 deaths